Didier Comès (11 December 1942 – 7 March 2013) was a Belgian comics artist, best known for his graphic novels published in the magazine (À Suivre).

Biography
Didier Comès was born as Dieter Hermann Comès in Sourbrodt in 1942. Growing up in a small village in the Hautes Fagnes with a German-speaking father and a French-speaking mother, he defines himself as a "bastard of two cultures". He left school at 16 to start working as an industrial artist in a factory in Verviers, making his debut in the newspaper Le Soir with the comic strip Hermann in 1969. Four years later he made his first typical long story, Le Dieu vivant, the first part of the series Ergün l'errant, for the Franco-Belgian comics magazine Pilote. In this story, like in most of his later work, the cinematic images take precedence over the story, which is fantastic, and centers around death and mythology.

His breakthrough followed with Silence, a harrowing story featuring a mute boy in the Ardennes after World War II. All these elements, war, mythology, troubled relations, witchcraft, animals, and death, often placed in the Ardennes, the region where he is born and lived, are recurring themes in most of his later graphic novels, long unrelated stories in black and white. Comès was early on influenced by fellow Ardennais comic artists René Hausman and Paul Deliège, and would later become friends with his example Hugo Pratt.

He died, aged 70, in March 2013.

Bibliography

Awards
 1980: Grand Prix Saint-Michel, Brussels, Belgium
 -  for best foreign artist at the Festival of Lucca, Italy

 1981: Best Comic Book at the Angoulême International Comics Festival, France
 1983: Best Comic at the Prix Saint-Michel

Notes

External links
 Biography at his publisher Casterman  Last retrieved 18 October 2006
 Biography at Comiclopedia Last retrieved 18 October 2006
 Fanpage about Comès   Last retrieved 18 October 2006

Sources
 Béra, Michel; Denni, Michel; and Mellot, Philippe (1998): "Trésors de la Bande Dessinée 1999–2000". Paris, Les éditions de l'amateur. 

1942 births
2013 deaths
Belgian comics artists
People from Waimes